Delta(4)-desaturase, sphingolipid 2 is a protein that in humans is encoded by the DEGS2 gene.

Function 

This gene encodes a bifunctional enzyme that is involved in the biosynthesis of sphingolipids in human skin and in other phytosphingolipid-containing tissues. This enzyme can act as a sphingolipid delta(4)-desaturase, and also as a sphingolipid C4-hydroxylase.

References

Further reading 

 
 
 

Genes
Human proteins